Kaitlyn Regehr is an Associate Professor of Digital Humanities at University College London, whose research is focused on the cultural impacts of new technology and social media, especially on the experiences of young people. She is best known for serving as a topic specialist for BBC Three.

Regehr's work has informed policy on gender and diversity in advertising for the Mayor of London and legislation on cyber flashing and image-based abuse in youth relationship cultures.  

Regehr's current project examines contemporary sex and relationship education, and considers the complex web of image exchange, pornography, consent and safe digital practices for youth in the techno-facilitated era.

She has served as a topic specialist on documentaries for the BBC, Discovery Network, Channel 4 and The Guardian.

Early life and work 
Regehr was born in Toronto, Canada. Her mother, Cheryl Regehr, is  Provost of the University of Toronto. Her Father is British born psychiatrist Graham Glancy, who has worked on notable cases including the Paul Bernardo case, and has served as president of both the Canadian and American Academy of Psychiatry and the Law.

Regehr served as a presenter on the popular Slice Network (Canada) and Bio Network (UK) television series Re-Vamped, (Entertainment One) which examined women's physical empowerment, historic forms of beauty and burlesque.

Regehr holds a doctorate from King's College London.

References

External links
 Kaitlyn Regehr, University of Kent

1985 births
Living people
Alumni of King's College London
Academics of University College London